Marion Albert Pruett (October 4, 1949 – April 12, 1999) was an American serial killer.

Witness Protection Program 
In 1979, Pruett was given $800, a new name (Charles "Sonny" Pearson), and placed in the United States Federal Witness Protection Program after testifying about a federal prison slaying in Atlanta, Georgia. He then began his crime spree under his alias.  Pruett would later claim that he had perpetrated the prison murder, contradicting his previous testimony for which he had received federal protection.

Pruett killed Peggy Lowe after he kidnapped her on September 17, 1981 while robbing the Metrocenter Branch of Unifirst Bank (later Trustmark National Bank) in Jackson, Mississippi where she worked; Bobbie Jean Robertson, a convenience store clerk in Fort Smith, Arkansas; and Anthony Taitt and James Balderson, two convenience store clerks in Colorado. He received the death penalty for Lowe's murder, two more life sentences for the murders in Colorado, and the death penalty for Robertson's murder.

On trial in New Mexico for the March 2, 1981, murder of his common-law wife, Pamela Sue Barker (aka Michelle Lynn Pearson), Pruett admitted he had robbed her in order to support a $4,000 a week cocaine habit, but denied that he killed Barker, who was beaten to death, then set on fire. He was convicted, and given a third life sentence. From death row, he asked a Mississippi newspaper to pay him $20,000 to disclose the location of Barker's engagement ring, and offered to reveal the location of a Florida victim's body in exchange for a paid appearance on Geraldo.

Execution 

His final meal consisted of a stuffed crust pizza from Pizza Hut, four Burger King Whoppers, a large order of French fries, three two-liter bottles of Pepsi, a bucket of ice, a bottle of ketchup, salt, fried eggplant, fried squash, fried okra, and a pecan pie. In an interview prior to his execution date, Pruett said he was going to share his last meal with another inmate who was going to be executed the same day. He went on to say he originally wanted to have a roast duck for his last meal, but it was rejected because he felt the prison would not cook it.

Pruett was executed by lethal injection at 8:04 PM and pronounced dead at 8:09 PM. Pruett was the 19th person executed by Arkansas since Furman v. Georgia.

Victims 
Pamela Sue Barker - April, 1981, Rio Rancho
Peggy Lowe - September 17, 1981, Jackson
Bobbie Jean Robertson - October 12, 1981, Fort Smith 
James R. Balderson - October 16, 1981, Fort Collins
Anthony Taitt - October 16, 1981, Loveland

See also 
 Capital punishment in Arkansas
 Capital punishment in the United States
 List of people executed in Arkansas
 List of serial killers in the United States

References

External links 
 A&E American Justice episode "Dealing With the Devil"

1949 births
1981 murders in the United States
1999 deaths
20th-century executions by Arkansas
20th-century executions of American people
Executed American serial killers
Executed people from North Carolina
Male serial killers
People convicted of murder by Arkansas
People executed by Arkansas by lethal injection
People from Gastonia, North Carolina
People who entered the United States Federal Witness Protection Program